View of Delft is an oil painting by Johannes Vermeer, painted ca. 1659–1661. The painting of the Dutch artist's hometown is among his best known, painted at a time when cityscapes were rare. It is one of three known paintings of Delft by Vermeer, along with The Little Street and the lost painting House Standing in Delft. The use of pointillism in the work suggests that it postdates The Little Street, and the absence of bells in the tower of the New Church dates it to 1660–1661. Vermeer's View of Delft has been held in the Dutch Royal Cabinet of Paintings at the Mauritshuis in The Hague since its establishment in 1822.

Description
The landscape was painted from an elevated position to the southeast of Delft, possibly the upper floor of a house on the quayside across the river Schie. Behind the Schiedam Gate is the long red-roofed arsenal (the Armamentarium). 

It is a morning scene, with the sun to the east (viewer's right) illuminating the Protestant Nieuwe Kerk ("New Church", right of centre) before its bells were replaced in 1660. The New Church in Delft is the burial place of William the Silent and other members of the House of Orange-Nassau.

To the left is the tower the "De Papegaey" (Parrot) brewery (since demolished) and, to its left, the top of the tower of the Oude Kerk ("Old Church"). Some barges are drawn up on the quayside, with a few people passing by. The top half of the painting is dominated by a cloudy sky, with a dark cloud suggesting a rain shower has just passed.

It is believed that Vermeer created this painting using an optical device—possibly a camera obscura, or a telescope—to capture the detail.

In July 2020, Professor Donald Olson, of Texas State University, published research shedding new light on the date and time captured by the painting.

Painting materials
The technical analysis shows that Vermeer used a limited choice of pigments for this painting: calcite, lead white, yellow ochre, natural ultramarine and madder lake are the main painting materials. His painting technique, on the other hand, is very elaborate and meticulous.

Legacy
The painting may have been bought by Pieter van Ruijven and inherited by his daughter Magdalena.  It is known to have passed through the collection of her husband Jacob Dissius, who auctioned it on 16 May 1696. In the auction catalog the picture was No. 32 ("The town of Delft in perspective, seen from the south"); it was sold for 200 guilders. In the eighteenth century it was owned by merchant Willem Philip Kops. After his death it passed on to his wife, who in turn after her death in 1820 passed it on to her daughter, Johanna Kops, who finally decided to auction it.  It was auctioned in 1822, and bought for 2,900 guilders for the new Dutch Royal Cabinet of Paintings established at the Mauritshuis.  

The painting  features in Marcel Proust's novel In Search of Lost Time, in the death scene of the writer Bergotte, in The Captive, who dies just in front of the View of Delft. Bergotte before dying had taken inspiration from Vermeer's technique: "That's how I ought to have written .... My last books are too dry, I ought to have ... made my language precious in itself, like this little patch of yellow wall ('petit pan de mur jaune')". Proust himself greatly admired Vermeer (spelling it "Ver Meer", the old way), particularly this painting. On 1 May 1921, in a letter to his friend Jean-Louis Vaudoyer, Proust mentioned when he saw the work for the first time:

In 1921, although severely ill, Proust visited the Jeu de Paume, an exhibition in which there was also the View of Delft. On the way to the museum he collapsed for a sudden feeling of weakness.

In 2011, the painting was featured on gold and silver commemorative coins issued by the Royal Dutch Mint.

See also
 100 Great Paintings

References

Further reading

 Arthur K. Wheelock Jr. and C. J. Kaldenbach, "Vermeer’s View of Delft and His Vision of Reality", Artibus et Historiae, Vol. 3, No. 6 (1982), pp. 9–35.

External links
 The View of Delft by Johannes Vermeer, a guided art history tour through this painting
 Johannes Vermeer, View of Delft, ColourLex
 Janson, J., Critical Assessments: View of Delft, Essential Vermeer website
 View of Delft at the website of the Mauritshuis

1660 paintings
History of Delft
Landscape paintings by Johannes Vermeer
Paintings in the collection of the Mauritshuis
Ships in art
Cityscape paintings